Paul Brady (born 1947) is an Irish singer-songwriter.

Paul Brady may also refer to:

Paul Brady (handballer) (born 1979), Irish handballer
Paul L. Brady (born 1927), American judge

See also
 Paul Bradley (disambiguation)
 Paul Brody (born 1961), American jazz trumpeter, composer and bandleader